Pai Yun-yiao (born 14 March 1969) is a Taiwanese taekwondo practitioner. 

She won a gold medal in flyweight at the 1987 World Taekwondo Championships in Barcelona. She won a silver medal at the 1989 World Taekwondo Championships, after being defeated by Won Sun-jin in the final.

References

External links

1969 births
Living people
Taiwanese female taekwondo practitioners
World Taekwondo Championships medalists
Taekwondo practitioners at the 1988 Summer Olympics
20th-century Taiwanese women